Cândida Branca Flor (12 November 1949 – 11 July 2001) was a famous Portuguese entertainer and traditional singer whose career spanned four decades.

Biography
Cândida Branca Flor was born on 12 November 1949 in Beringel, Beja municipality, Alentejo region, in southern Portugal, and became one of the most recognized Portuguese singers.

She went to song classes with Maria do Rosário Coelho and was a member of Banda do Casaco in the 1970s. She took her artistic name from a song by this group, called "Romance de Branca Flor".

She was an idol to Portuguese children in the 1970s and 1980s as the conductor, with Júlio Isidro, and the singer of the soundtrack, of the TV program "Fungagá da Bicharada".

She participated three times in the Portuguese selection for the Eurovision Song Contest: in 1979 with the song "A Nossa Serenata", in 1982 with the song "Trocas Baldrocas" and in 1983 with the song "Vinho do Porto (Vinho de Portugal)", a duet with Carlos Paião. Between 1978 and 1993 she released eight albums and took part in several Portuguese folk music projects and events for Portuguese emigrants.

She died on 11 July 2001 in Massamá, a suburb of Sintra.

Discography

Singles

Albums

Participations

Compilations

References

External links 
 
 Cândida Branca Flor on Discogs

1949 births
2001 suicides
People from Beja, Portugal
20th-century Portuguese women singers
Suicides in Portugal